Sahlen’s Stadium may refer to:
 the main stadium of WakeMed Soccer Park (Cary, North Carolina)
 Marina Auto Stadium (Rochester, New York), formerly known under this name

See also
 Sahlen Field